Clayton Vance Heafner (July 20, 1914 – December 31, 1960) was an American golfer, and the father of golfer Vance Heafner.

Heafner was born in Charlotte, North Carolina.

Heafner won seven times on the PGA Tour, played on two Ryder Cup teams, and finished runner-up in the 1949 and 1951 U.S. Opens. Often described as “fiery” and as a “fierce competitor”, Heafner played on two victorious Ryder Cup teams, in 1949 and 1951, with a four-match record of 3-0-1. In the 1949 match, the U.S. was without Ben Hogan, Byron Nelson and Cary Middlecoff, but Heafner keyed a winning rally from a 3-1 team deficit by beating Dick Burton 3 and 2.

He finished second in the 1951 U.S. Open to Ben Hogan.

Heafner was also a key figure in helping Charlie Sifford break the color barrier on the PGA Tour, by playing matches against him on Mondays and providing counsel Sifford carried with him through his playing days.

Heafner played in nine Masters, and when his son Vance played in the 1978 Masters, they became one of nine father-son duos to play the storied event. Clayton and Vance are also only one of five father-son combinations to win a PGA Tour event.

Heafner died in 1960 in Charlotte, North Carolina. He was inducted into the North Carolina Sports Hall of Fame in 1974 and the Greater Charlotte Sports Hall of Fame in 2006.

Professional wins

PGA Tour wins (4)
1941 Mahoning Valley Open
1942 Mahoning Valley Open
1947 Jacksonville Open
1948 Colonial National Invitation

Other wins (3)
this list may be incomplete
1939 Carolinas Open
1950 Carolinas PGA Championship
1953 Carolinas Open

Results in major championships

Note: Heafner never played in The Open Championship.

NT = no tournament
WD = withdrew
CUT = missed the half-way cut
R64, R32, R16, QF, SF = round in which player lost in PGA Championship match play
"T" indicates a tie for a place

Summary

Most consecutive cuts made – 8 (1949 Masters – 1952 Masters)
Longest streak of top-10s – 4 (1949 Masters – 1950 Masters)

External links
Biography

American male golfers
PGA Tour golfers
Ryder Cup competitors for the United States
Golfers from Charlotte, North Carolina
1914 births
1960 deaths